The following is a list of paintings by Rembrandt in order of appearance (catalogue numbers 1–630), that were attributed as autograph by Abraham Bredius in 1935.

See also
List of paintings by Rembrandt (an updated list of attributions based on recent work by the Rembrandt Research Project)

Sources

 Rembrandt Paintings, by Abraham Bredius, Uitgeversmaatschappij W. De Haan N.V., Utrecht, 1935

 
Rembrandt Paintings
Rembrandt
Rembrandt studies